Astelia chathamica, the Chatham Islands kakaha, Maori flax, or silver spear, is a species of flowering plant in the recently named family Asteliaceae. Forming a large clump of sword-shaped leaves, it produces small green flowers and red berries (the latter only on the female plant). It grows best in partial shade and in fertile and well-drained soil with moderate water.

In cultivation in the UK, this plant has gained the Royal Horticultural Society’s Award of Garden Merit.

References

 New Zealand J. Bot. 4: 228 1966
 The Plant List entry
 Kew World Checklist entry
 San Marcos Growers entry

Asteliaceae
Endemic flora of New Zealand
Flora of the Chatham Islands
Plants described in 1966